The Bor District is one of nine administrative districts of Southern and Eastern Serbia. It has a population of 123,848 inhabitants, according to the 2011 census results. The administrative center of the Bor district is the city of Bor and the judicial one, due to tradition, Negotin. This district is the easternmost district of Serbia and contains the Serbian panhandle that extends into the Romanian border.

History
The Triballi dominated the region before the Roman conquest in the 1st century BC that weakened and subdued the Paleo-Balkan tribes. The Triballi, a Triballi-Dacian tribe, were defeated by the Roman army under Marcus Licinius Crassus, the consul of 30 BC. The region was organized into Moesia Inferior in 87 AD by Emperor Domitian.

Hellenistic religious influence is attested through archeological findings in Rovine and Tamnič where Heracles was worshipped, a relief of Zeus, Herakles and Dionysos found in Bukovo.

The Roman site of Selište with necropolis has been excavated in the village of Rogljevo. Silver and gold fibulae from 250–320 AD have been found at sites in Negotin.

Municipalities
The district encompasses the city of Bor and three municipalities:
 Kladovo
 Majdanpek
 Negotin

Demographics

According to the last official census done in 2011, the Bor District has 124,992 inhabitants.

Ethnic groups
The ethnic composition of the Bor district is as follows:

Economy
The region is a traditionally energy oriented, as it has the hydro-electric power plants of Đerdap: Iron Gate I and Iron Gate II and is also rich in copper and gold deposits, especially in the Bor and Majdanpek areas; also silver has also been discovered but is rare. The giant mining company RTB Bor operates in the region.

See also
Đerdap national park
Lepenski Vir
Trajan's Bridge
Rajko's Cave
Bukovo monastery
Iron Gate I Hydroelectric Power Station
RTB Bor
Administrative divisions of Serbia
Districts of Serbia

References

Note: All official material made by the Government of Serbia is public by law. Information was taken from the official website.

External links

 
 Radio television Bor
 Undiscovered locations in Serbia / Neotkrivene lokacije u Srbiji (Serbian)

 
Districts of Southern and Eastern Serbia